Mirco Antenucci (born 8 September 1984) is an Italian professional footballer who plays as a forward for  club Bari.

Club career

Giulianova
Antenucci began his professional career in 2002, with Serie C1 club, Giulianova, where in two seasons with the club, the young striker managed to make 35 appearances, before spending the 2004–05 season on loan at Serie C2 side, Ancona. During his loan spell with the club, Antenucci scored twice in 27 league appearances, before returning to Giulianova in the summer of 2005. In his second tenure with the Teramo-based club, Antenucci scored 12 goals in 57 league matches, over the course of two seasons.

Catania
In July 2007, he was signed by Serie A side, Catania, and was loaned to Venezia ahead of the 2007–08 Serie C1 campaign. He made 27 league appearances that season, scoring six goals.

On 1 July 2008, Antenucci returned to Catania and entered into the first team squad. He made four substitute appearances under, then coach, Walter Zenga in the first half of the 2008–09 Serie A season. On 5 January 2009, Mirko Antenucci was sent out on loan to Serie B club Pisa, to gain experience and playing time. During his six-month spell with the Serie B club, Antenucci scored just one goal in 20 league appearances, and the club failed to avoid relegation and also bankrupted. He returned to Catania on 30 June 2009.

On 19 August 2009, Catania opted to send Antenucci on another loan deal to Ascoli, where he joined fellow Catania loanees Marcello Gazzola and Vito Falconieri. Following his transfer to Ascoli, he thrived, earning a regular starting role, and going on to make 40 appearances in the league, scoring an impressive 24 goals, finishing the second top scorer in the whole of Serie B. He only missed two league matches: the first round of the season and once due to suspension. He returned to Catania ahead of the 2010–11 Serie A season. Antenucci did make 14 league appearances for Catania that season, although most of them were off the substitute's bench with Maxi López, Francesco Lodi, Gonzalo Bergessio and Takayuki Morimoto competing for places up front. After just one goal in Serie A, Antenucci was sent out on a co-ownership agreement during the January transfer window.

Torino
On 23 January 2011, it was announced that he joined Serie B club Torino in a co-ownership deal. In his first 6-month spell with the club, Antenucci scored 6 goals in his first 19 appearances, before turning in an additional 10 goals in 40 league appearances the following season. Forming a strong strike partnership with Rolando Bianchi. His efforts helped guide the club to a second-placed finish in the 2011–12 Serie B standings with promotion to Serie A.

Return to Catania
On 21 June 2012, Catania outbid Torino in a blind auction for the players' co-ownership, and so the 28-year-old returned to Sicily ahead of the 2012–13 Serie A season. After making a substitute appearance in matchday one of the season on 26 August 2012, the player was sent out on loan to Spezia of Serie B, on yet another season-long loan deal, and finished the season with six goals in 33 league matches.

Ternana
Antenucci was sold in a co-ownership deal and loaned to Serie B side Ternana on 20 July 2013, where he was also named captain. He scored his first goal in the first round against Carpi, a penalty kick. The following game he scored against Cittadella with a goal in a 2–2 draw. Antenucci also scored on the fifth, sixth and ninth day respectively against Siena, Brescia and Virtus Lanciano. After one win in nine games, Ternana found themselves in the relegation zone. He scored a brace during a resounding 5–0 victory over Novara and the next week, repeated the feat with another brace against Crotone.

In the first half of the season, Antenucci had scored nine goals in 21 games. In the second round, the Terni technical changes, passing the leadership in the hands of Attilio Tesser. Antenucci begins with a bang, the second round, scoring six goals in eleven games, which helped Ternana to remain undefeated for twelve games.

On 5 April 2013, he missed his second penalty of the season (the first against Latina) and again against Cesena, the defeat saw the end of Ternana's undefeated spell of 12 games. He returned to goal scoring form on the 36th day, in a 3–3 draw against Modena and repeated his goal scoring form in subsequent games against Bari and Padova respectively.

His goal against Spezia in a 2–2 draw on 22 March 2014, where he controlled a ball on his chest before striking a bicycle kick, was awarded by The News Strip as Goal of The Year. Sky Sport Italia voted the goal second place for Goal of the Season behind Paul Pogba's strike for Juventus against Napoli.

After scoring 19 goals in 40 Serie B appearances for the rossoverde, he finished the fifth top scorer in Serie B for the 2013–14 season helping Ternana avoid relegation with a 16th-placed finish.

His contract was redeemed by the Umbrian club upon the conclusion of the co-ownership agreement on 20 June 2014, for an undisclosed fee.

Leeds United

2014–15 season

On 19 August 2014, it was reported that Leeds United had agreed a deal with the Ternana first-team captain to join the club. It was confirmed on 20 August 2014 via the player's own Twitter account that he had joined Leeds. On Saturday 23 August, Antenucci made his Leeds debut against Watford in a 4–1 defeat. Antenucci made his home debut at Elland Road on 30 August against Bolton Wanderers. On 16 September 2014, he scored his first league goal for Leeds against Bournemouth in a 3–1 win. Antenucci finished the 2014–15 season as top scorer for Leeds with 10 league goals. On 2 July 2015, Antenucci's agent Silvio Pagliari revealed that Antenucci and Giuseppe Bellusci would be staying at Leeds and that owner Massimo Cellino said both players were going to be important players for the 2015–16 season.

2015–16 season
On 31 July 2015, Antenucci was given his favoured squad number 7 for the upcoming 2015–16 season. On 8 August 2015, on the opening day of the Championship season, Antenucci started the game on the bench against Burnley but came on a substitute and scored a stunning left footed strike to put Leeds 1–0 up in a match that finished as a 1–1 draw. On 12 August 2015, Antenucci scored a penalty in a penalty shootout against Doncaster Rovers in the League Cup, with Leeds losing 4–2 on penalties after a 1–1 draw.

On 19 April, Antenucci was nominated for the Leeds United player of the year award, alongside Charlie Taylor, Liam Bridcutt, Gaetano Berardi and Lewis Cook. The award was won by Taylor on 30 April. Antenucci finished the 2015–16 season as Leeds' second top goal scorer with 9 goals behind Chris Wood who scored 13.

On 7 May 2016, Antenucci revealed in a post on his official Instagram account that he would be leaving Leeds.

SPAL
On 30 June 2016, Antenucci joined Serie B side S.P.A.L. on a free transfer from Leeds. On 15 August 2016, Antenucci scored on his debut for S.P.A.L. against Cagliari in a 5–1 defeat in the Coppa Italia Cup.

He scored 18 goals in his first season at the club and finished the third top scorer in Serie B behind top scorer Giampaolo Pazzini (23 goals) and runner up Fabio Ceravolo (21 goals). His goals proved to be crucial as S.P.A.L. gained promotion to Serie A for the first time in 49 years by winning Serie B despite only being promoted to Serie B for the first time since 1992–93.

During the 2017–18 season in Serie A he scored 11 times in 33 games, to help the club successfully retain their status in Serie A. The following season ended in similar fashion, with Spal successfully avoiding relegation and Antenucci scoring 5 goals in 35 appearances.

Bari
In July 2019 he moved to Serie C newcomers Bari on a permanent basis.

International career
In 2002, Antenucci represented Italy U-20 C1 before then representing Italy U-21 C1 Italy Lega Pro in 2003.

In 2005, Antenucci won gold representing Italy, in the 2005 Summer Universiade in Turkey. With Italy winning the Gold medal beating Japan in the Summer Universiade Men's Football final.

Career statistics

Honours
SPAL
 Serie B : 2016–17
Bari
 Serie C: 2021–22 (Group C)

References

External links
 Football.it Profile 
 Catania Profile 

1984 births
Living people
Sportspeople from the Province of Campobasso
Footballers from Molise
Italian footballers
Association football forwards
Serie A players
Serie B players
Serie C players
Giulianova Calcio players
A.C. Ancona players
Catania S.S.D. players
Venezia F.C. players
Pisa S.C. players
Ascoli Calcio 1898 F.C. players
Torino F.C. players
Spezia Calcio players
Ternana Calcio players
S.P.A.L. players
S.S.C. Bari players
English Football League players
Leeds United F.C. players
Italian expatriate sportspeople in England
Expatriate footballers in England
Italian expatriate footballers